Tarik Hadžić (born March 17, 1994 in Rožaje, Montenegro) is an alpine skier from Montenegro. He will compete for Montenegro at the 2014 Winter Olympics in the slalom and giant slalom. Hadžić was also selected to carry the Montenegrin flag during the opening ceremony.

See also
Montenegro at the 2014 Winter Olympics

References

1994 births
Living people
Bosniaks of Montenegro
Montenegrin male alpine skiers
Olympic alpine skiers of Montenegro
Alpine skiers at the 2014 Winter Olympics
People from Rožaje